The Bauru Group is a geological group of the Bauru Sub-basin, Paraná Basin in Minas Gerais, São Paulo, General Salgado, Itapecuru-Mirim, Mato Grosso, Brazil whose strata date back to the Late Cretaceous. Dinosaur remains are among the fossils that have been recovered from the formation.

Subdivisions 
According to a 2016 study:
The Bauru Basin covers an area of approximately 379.362 km2 located almost exclusively in Brazil.., with selected outcrops in Northeastern Paraguay (Fúlfaro, 1996). This Cretaceous sedimentary succession reflects changing nonmarine environments, such as eolian, lacustrine, fluvial and alluvial fans.

The Bauru Group was divided by Fernandes and Coimbra (1996) in four formations, namely Adamantina, Uberaba, Araçatuba and Marília. In 1998, Fernandes revised the group and recognize six formations, Uberaba, Vale do Rio do Peixe, Araçatuba, São José do Rio Preto, Presidente Prudente and Marília. The Adamantina Formation was divided in Vale do Rio do Peixe, São José do Rio Preto and Presidente Prudente Formations.

Vertebrate paleofauna

Molluscan paleofauna

Gastropoda 
 Physa aridi Mezzalira, 1974
 Physa mezzalirai Ghilardi, Carbonaro & Simone, 2011
 Viviparus souzai Mezzalira, 1974

Bivalvia 
 Anodontites freitasi Mezzalira, 1974
 Anodontites pricei Mezzalira, 1974
 Diplodon arrudai Mezzalira, 1974
 Florenceia peiropolensis Mezzalira, 1974
 Itaimbea priscus (Ihering, 1913)
 Monocondylaea cominatoi Mezzalira, 1974
 Sancticarolis tolentinoi Mezzalira, 1974
 Taxodontites paulistanensis (Mezzalira, 1974)

See also 
 List of dinosaur-bearing rock formations
 Areado Group of the São Francisco Basin
 Santana Group of the Araripe Basin

References 

Geologic groups of South America
Geologic formations of Brazil
Upper Cretaceous Series of South America
Cretaceous Brazil
Coniacian Stage
Santonian Stage
Campanian Stage
Maastrichtian Stage of South America
Fossiliferous stratigraphic units of South America
Paleontology in Brazil
Formations